Henning Throne-Holst (25 July 1895 – 23 March 1980) was a Norwegian born, Swedish industrialist.

Biography
Throne-Holst was born at Strinda  in Sør-Trøndelag, Norway.  He was the son of Johan Throne Holst (1868-1946) and Hanna Richter Jenssen (1873-1952). His father was the founder and CEO of Freia and of Marabou. His brother  Harald Throne-Holst (1905-1996) was director and later chairman of the Freia.

He grew up in Kristiania (now Oslo) and graduated from Aars and Voss School in 1913.  He attended business school in Berlin and began studying economics at the University of Kristiania.  In 1918, he was sent to head the first Swedish chocolate factory, AB Marabou in Sundbyberg outside Stockholm.  He was CEO of the Swedish chocolate factory Marabou from 1918 to 1947. 
Throne-Holst was later CEO of Scania-Vabis and of SAS. He was chairman of the board of Findus from 1941 to 1946, and Freia from 1946 to 1971.

Personal life
In 1923, he married Gunhild Jenssen (1899-1986). He was decorated Knight, First Class of the Order of St. Olav in 1945, and Commander of the Order of Vasa and Order of Dannebrog. His autobiography Mitt livs företag was published during 1973. He died in Stockholm during 1980.

References

Other sources
Henning Throne-Holst (1973) Mitt livs företag  (Bonnier)

External links
Henning and Johan Throne-Holst Foundation

1895 births
1980 deaths
People from Sør-Trøndelag
University of Oslo alumni
20th-century Swedish businesspeople
Swedish business executives
Norwegian emigrants to Sweden
Recipients of the St. Olav's Medal
Commanders of the Order of Vasa
Commanders of the Order of the Dannebrog
Knights of the Order of the Polar Star